Rino Pucci (29 January 1922 – 10 December 1986) was an Italian cyclist. He was born in Pistoia. He won a silver medal in team pursuit at the 1948 Summer Olympics in London, together with Arnaldo Benfenati, Anselmo Citterio and Guido Bernardi.

References

External links
 
 
 

1922 births
1986 deaths
People from Pistoia
Italian male cyclists
Cyclists at the 1948 Summer Olympics
Olympic cyclists of Italy
Olympic silver medalists for Italy
Olympic medalists in cycling
Medalists at the 1948 Summer Olympics
Sportspeople from the Province of Pistoia
Cyclists from Tuscany